Tatineni Chalapathi Rao (22 December 1920 – 22 February 1994) was an Indian music composer who worked in Telugu cinema. His career spanned more than three decades from early 1950s, till 1980s. He was the cousin of T. Prakash Rao.

Early life 
Born to Dronavilli Manikyamma and Rattayya in the village of Vuyyuru in the Krishna district of Andhra Pradesh on 22 December 1920, but he was adopted by Tatineni Koteswara Rao and his wife Kotamma. He was the cousin of T. Prakash Rao.

Career
His first film as music director was the Telugu film Puttillu in 1953 jointly with another music director, Mohan Das. His first independent work was for the Tamil film Amara Deepam (1956). Thereafter until 1984 he scored music for around 125 films mostly in Telugu and some in Tamil.

He created many popular songs for films starring Akkineni Nageswara Rao. Through the 1950s, 1960s and 1970s, Chalapathi Rao and Nageswara Rao gave innumerable hits. Notable among them are Illarikam (1959), Punarjanma (1963), Manushulu Mamatalu (1965), Navaratri (1966), Dharma Daata (1970) and Srimanthudu (1971); together with some real chartbusters in 1972 which include Datta Putrudu, Manchi Rojulu Vachhayi and Raithu Kutumbam. To the end the pair continued to create music for films including Kanna Koduku (1973), Palletoori Baava (1973), Aalu Magalu (1977) and Sri Rama Raksha (1978).

T. Chalapathi Rao's hit scores with other Telugu heroes including Manchi Rojulu Vachchayi, Amma Nanna, Manchi Manasu and Kamalamma Kamatam with Krishnam Raju, Lakshadhikari, Ramuni Minchina Ramudu, Kalavaari Kodalu with N. T. Rama Rao and films such as Goodhachari 116, Asadhyudu with Krishna.

The last film he scored music for was Janam Manam in 1984.

Personal life
He was married to Annapurna with whom he did not have children and later married Dr Jamuna with whom he had two sons and a daughter.

Filmography

References

1920 births
1994 deaths
Telugu film score composers
Tamil film score composers
People from Krishna district
20th-century Indian composers
Film musicians from Andhra Pradesh